The 1966 European Judo Championships were the 15th edition of the European Judo Championships, and were held in Luxembourg City, Luxembourg from 6 to 7 May 1966. Championships were subdivided into six individual competitions, and a separate team competition. Individual events were not discriminated into amateur and professional as before.

Medal overview

Individual

Teams

Medal table

References 

E
European Judo Championships
1966 in Luxembourgian sport
Judo competitions in Luxembourg
International sports competitions hosted by Luxembourg
Sports competitions in Luxembourg City
May 1966 sports events in Europe
1960s in Luxembourg City